BWP could refer to:
 Botswana pula - the currency of Botswana
 BWP: The British Way and Purpose: Directorate of Army Education pamphlets issued during World War II 
 Bradley Wright-Phillips, an English association football player
 Belgische Werkliedenpartij, the Dutch name of the first Belgian socialist party.
 Botswana pula, by ISO 4217 currency code, for Botswana currency
 The Blair Witch Project, a successful low-budget horror film
 the ornithological handbook The Birds of the Western Palearctic
 The Baltimore–Washington Parkway
 Bytches With Problems, a former female rap duo
 Bridgewater Place, a skyscraper in Leeds, England
 Belgisch Warmbloed Paard,
 The Bretton Woods Project, which monitors the World Bank and IMF
 Brutality Will Prevail, a Welsh hardcore band